Cheating is an immoral way of achieving a goal.

Cheating may also refer to:
Cheating (biology), a metaphor used in behavioral ecology to describe organisms that receive a benefit at the cost of other organisms
Cheating (law), a specific criminal offence relating to property
Cheating, a synonym of infidelity, used to describe adultery

Art, entertainment, and media

Film
 Cheating, Inc., a 1991 short silent film about students cheating
 Cheatin' (film), 2013

Games
Cheating in bridge
Cheating in chess
Cheating in video games
Cheating in online games

Music
"Cheating" (song), a song by John Newman
"Cheatin'" (song), a 2006 single by Sara Evans

See also
 Cheat (disambiguation)
 Cheater (disambiguation)